Terei may refer to:

 Terei language, a language of Bougainville, Papua New Guinea
 Pio Terei (born 1958), New Zealand actor, singer and comedian
 Sonny Terei, member of the Cook Island music group Pepe and the Rarotongans

See also 
 Terai (disambiguation)